Chloroplast Sensor Kinase (CSK) is a protein in chloroplasts and cyanobacteria, bacteria from which chloroplasts evolved by endosymbiosis. It is part of a two-component system. In the plant Arabidopsis thaliana (thale cress) CSK is the product of the gene At1g67840. CSK is known in cyanobacteria as the histidine kinase 2 (Hik2).

CSK is an iron-sulfur protein with 3 iron and 4 sulphur atoms in its redox-active site. It has a midpoint redox potential of −15 mV at pH 8, which is consistent with its autophosphorylation communicating the redox state of the plastoquinone pool to regulation of chloroplast or cyanobacterial DNA transcription – specifically of genes for proteins at the photochemical reaction center of photosystem I.

In cyanobacteria and non-green algae, it is a histidine kinase that work by autophosphorylation on a conserved histidine residue, then in turn passing the phosphoryl group to Rre1 and Rppa. These components are not found in green plants, where CSK might work as a serine/threonine kinase passing the group to sigma factor 1 (SIG1) instead.

CSK is a prediction of the CoRR Hypothesis for genes in organelles. CSK is intrinsic to chloroplasts, targeted to chloroplast genes, and may have been required for the retention, in evolution, of chloroplast DNA.

Notes

Plant proteins